Kjell Victor Sköld (born 31 July 1989) is a Swedish footballer who plays for Landvetter IS as a forward.

Career statistics

Honours
;Falkenbergs FF
 Superettan: 2013
Individual
Superettan Top Scorer: 2013

References

External links
 
 

1989 births
Living people
Falkenbergs FF players
Åtvidabergs FF players
IFK Göteborg players
Örebro SK players
Örgryte IS players
Swedish footballers
Sweden youth international footballers
Allsvenskan players
Superettan players
Ettan Fotboll players
Association football forwards
People from Kalmar
Sportspeople from Kalmar County